Adrianti Firdasari (born 16 December 1986) is a retired Indonesian badminton player from Jaya Raya Jakarta club.

Career 
In 2005, Firdasari won the women's singles at the New Zealand Open. Firdasari played the 2007 BWF World Championships in women's singles, and was defeated in the second round by Xu Huaiwen of Germany, 21–17, 22–20. She played on Sudirman Cup  for Indonesia, who finished second to China in 2005 and 2007. In the 2008 Singapore Super Series, she made a surprise by beating the 1st-seeded Pi Hongyan of France, 21–16, 20–22, 21–16 in the second round. She played in 2008 Denmark Super Series and she beat Wang Chen of Hongkong, 21–10 19–21 21–14, in the first round. In the next round, she lost to Tine Rasmussen of Denmark in straight sets. In 2009, she played in the Korea Super Series and went through the quarterfinal after beating Saina Nehwal of India in rubber set. During the 2011 Southeast Asian Games, she lost to Fu Mingtian of Singapore in the finals, 14–21, 21–12, 22–20. At the 2012 Summer Olympics she qualified from Group O, before losing to Wang Xin in the second round. Firdasari announced her retirement through her Instagram account in December 2015, and in 2016, she started a new career as a coach in Jaya Raya badminton club.

Achievements

Southeast Asian Games 

Women's singles

BWF Grand Prix (3 titles, 2 runners-up) 
The BWF Grand Prix had two levels, the Grand Prix and Grand Prix Gold. It was a series of badminton tournaments sanctioned by the Badminton World Federation (BWF) and played between 2007 and 2017. The World Badminton Grand Prix has been sanctioned by the International Badminton Federation from 1983 to 2006.

Women's singles

  BWF Grand Prix Gold tournament
  BWF & IBF Grand Prix tournament

IBF International (1 runner-up) 
Women's singles

Performance timeline

National team 
 Junior level

 Senior level

Individual competitions 
 Senior level

References

External links 
 
 

1986 births
Living people
Sportspeople from Jakarta
Indonesian female badminton players
Badminton players at the 2012 Summer Olympics
Olympic badminton players of Indonesia
Badminton players at the 2006 Asian Games
Badminton players at the 2010 Asian Games
Asian Games bronze medalists for Indonesia
Asian Games medalists in badminton
Medalists at the 2010 Asian Games
Competitors at the 2005 Southeast Asian Games
Competitors at the 2007 Southeast Asian Games
Competitors at the 2009 Southeast Asian Games
Competitors at the 2011 Southeast Asian Games
Southeast Asian Games gold medalists for Indonesia
Southeast Asian Games silver medalists for Indonesia
Southeast Asian Games bronze medalists for Indonesia
Southeast Asian Games medalists in badminton
Badminton coaches
20th-century Indonesian women
21st-century Indonesian women